A22 or A-22 is a three-character acronym that may refer to:

Vehicles 
A 22 (keelboat), a sailing yacht
A-22 Maryland, an American light bomber of World War II manufactured by Glenn L. Martin Company 
Aero A.22, a Czech civil utility aircraft built during the 1920s
Aeroprakt A-22, a Ukrainian ultralight aircraft
Arrows A22, a Formula One car
Fiat A.22, a piston aero-engine used on the 1925 Italian aircraft Ansaldo A.120
IVL A.22 Hansa, a 1922 Finnish license copy of the German two-seat, low winged single-engined seaplane Hansa-Brandenburg W.33
MAN A22, internal code for the NLxx3F low-floor single-deck bus chassis built by MAN

Biomedicine 
British NVC community A22 (Littorella uniflora - Lobelia dortmanna community), a plant community
 ICD-10 code for Anthrax
 Chemical compound A22 (S-[3,4-dichlorobenzyl] isothiourea hydrochloride) with antibiotic activity

Others  
List of A22 roads
English Opening, Encyclopaedia of Chess Openings code